Ballophilus comastes is a species of arthropod in the genus Ballophilus. It is found in the Philippines. The original description of this species is based on a specimen with 49 pairs of legs.

References 

Ballophilidae
Animals described in 1971